"Butcher's Tale (Western Front 1914)" is a song written by Chris White and first released on The Zombies 1968 album Odessey and Oracle.  It was also released as a single in the US in June 1968, backed by "This Will Be Our Year."  It was recorded in one take on 20 July 1967 at EMI Abbey Road Studio No. 3. The song has also been covered by They Might Be Giants, The Immediate, John Wilkes Booze and Chrysanthemums.

It's an anti-war song set during World War I on the Western Front. It specifically mentions Gommecourt, Thiepval, the woods of Mametz and Verdun in France, where key battles were fought.

Lyrics and music
The lyrics are based on an incident from World War I, a subject in which White took an interest.  The lyrics tell of a battle from the viewpoint of a soldier in the midst of the fight.  Despite the title, the battle White had in mind when writing the lyrics occurred in 1916.  The Bee Gees' 1967 song "New York Mining Disaster 1941" was apparently an inspiration for the serious tone of the song. In the album's CD liner notes, Alec Palao calls the song "a thinly-disguised comment on Vietnam."

Instrumentation for "Butcher's Tale (Western Front 1914)" is limited to Rod Argent playing harmonium in a manner described by Allmusic critic Matthew Greenwald as "odd-sounding."  Sound effects are also incorporated to help give the song its strange sound.  The sound effects were developed by playing a Pierre Boulez album backwards and speeded up.  The effect of the harmonium and sound effects is to make the song appear to be an example of musique concrète.

Although White wrote the song with the intention that Zombies' lead singer Colin Blunstone would sing it, White ended up singing the song because his weak trembley voice better suited the song.  Other than a verse in the song "Brief Candles," "Butcher's Tale (Western Front 1914)" is White's only lead vocal performance for The Zombies.

Reception
Although, in the words of Dorian Lynskey "Butcher's Tale (Western Front 1914)" was the band's "most soberly uncommercial song," Date Records chose it for a single off Odessey and Oracle.  This apparently due to the company seeing the song as a metaphor for the Vietnam War, which was emerging as a hot topic at the time, and partly due to the recommendation of Al Kooper, who was championing the band at the time.  The band, however, was surprised that such an uncommercial song was chosen as a single.  Not surprisingly, the single sold poorly.

Allmusic critic Matthew Greenwald called it one of The Zombies "strangest and most experimental songs," adding that it provided "a fine strangeness" to the album.  Pierre Perrone of The Independent claimed that the song proved that "the band were both of their time and incredibly prescient."  Arts writer Matt Kivel called the song a "creepy war ballad" and noted that it showed The Zombies experimenting with instrumentation in more imaginative ways than any other band except The Beatles.  Arts writer Mike Boehm called it "one of the greatest anti-war songs in the rock canon" and noted that it is "unsparing in its depiction of war's horrors" and "created characters and vivid, real-life scenes to take the listener into the trenches."  Music critic Antonio Mendez called it one of the sublime songs on Odessey and Oracle.

Other versions
The Chrysanthemums covered "Butcher's Tale (Western Front 1914)" on their 1989 version of Odessey and Oracle.  Allmusic critic Stewart Mason praised the "sneering hardcore punk setting" the group used for the song, stating that it "fits the horrific wartime imagery perfectly."  They Might Be Giants covered the song in 2000 on the multi-artist album Simply Mad, Mad, Mad, Mad About the Loser's Lounge.  John Wilkes Booze covered the song in 2004 on Five Pillars of Soul. Jonas Prangerød noted that the John Wilkes Booze version is short and strange. The Immediate covered the song in 2006 on Stop and Remember. The Sound Defects used parts of the speric chorus as samples in their track "War" on The Iron Horse.

See also
 List of anti-war songs

References

Songs about soldiers
Songs about the military
1968 singles
The Zombies songs
Songs written by Chris White (musician)
Anti-war songs
1968 songs
Songs of World War I
Post-traumatic stress disorder in fiction